A 1928 bust of Charles Roscoe Savage by Gilbert Riswold is installed in Salt Lake City, Utah, United States.

Description and history
Located at the intersection of Main Street and South Temple, the bronze sculpture measures approximately 7 x 1 x 1 feet and rests on a stone base which measures approximately 6 x 5 x 3 feet. It was surveyed by the Smithsonian Institution's "Save Outdoor Sculpture!" program in 1993.

References

External links

 

1928 sculptures
Busts in the United States
Monuments and memorials in Utah
Outdoor sculptures in Salt Lake City
Sculptures of men in Utah